Linda Garrou (January 17, 1943 – March 19, 2022) was a  Democratic member of the North Carolina General Assembly representing the state's thirty-second Senate district since 1999 until 2012. Her district includes constituents in Forsyth county. An administrator from Winston-Salem, North Carolina, Garrou was the Co-Chair of the Senate Appropriations/Base Committee, and the Pensions, Retirement and Aging Committee.

Garrou died on March 19, 2022 at Forsyth Memorial Hospital, in Winston-Salem, North Carolina.

References

External links
North Carolina General Assembly - Senator Linda Garrou official NC Senate website
Project Vote Smart - Senator Linda D. Garrou (NC) profile
Follow the Money - Linda Garrou
2008 2006 2004 2002 2000 1998 1996 campaign contributions

|-

1943 births
2022 deaths
Democratic Party North Carolina state senators
Women state legislators in North Carolina
Sullins College alumni
University of Georgia alumni
University of North Carolina at Chapel Hill alumni
21st-century American politicians
21st-century American women politicians
Politicians from Atlanta
Politicians from Winston-Salem, North Carolina
Educators from Georgia (U.S. state)
Educators from North Carolina